Gerald Jennings (born 1946) is a British aquarist and ichthyological taxonomist who has specialised in both the production of databases related to the identification of species and the production of simplified printed guides to fish identification. He has authored and co-authored over 100 books on fishes and fish related subjects. His photographic library has also been made freely available online.

Works
 Jennings, G.H.(1995–2004) Mediterranean Fishes. Calypso Publications. 
 Jennings, Gerald  (1996 on) Sea and Freshwater Fishes of Arabia (series).Calypso Publications.
 Jennings, G. et al. (1996) The Calypso Ichthyological Database. Calypso Publications. 
 Hall, T.R., Ford, Dr. D., Carrington, Dr. N.,Jennings, G.H. et al. A History of Tropical Marine Fishkeeping in the U.K.1960-1980 (1997) Calypso Publications. 
 Jennings, G.H. (1997) Asian Freshwater Fishes.

Notes

References 
Mediterranean Fishes."Guido Lanfranco, The Times of Malta, August 8th 1979 Valletta "
Asian Freshwater Fishes."FAMA,Volume 21 Number 8, August 1998 pp.194/195"

External links
 http://www.oceanexpert.net/viewMemberRecord.php?&memberID=8619
 http://www.fishbase.org/Collaborators/CollaboratorsTopicList.php
 http://www.calypso.org.uk
 http://www.kraken-marina.com
http://www.seawaters.org
https://independent.academia.edu/GeraldJennings/Analytics/activity/overview

1946 births
Living people
British ichthyologists
British taxonomists